Montauban-de-Bretagne (literally Montauban of Brittany; , Gallo: Montauban) is a commune in the Ille-et-Vilaine department in Brittany in northwestern France. On 1 January 2019, the former commune Saint-M'Hervon was merged into Montauban-de-Bretagne. The writer Jean Sulivan (1913–1980) was born in Montauban.

Previously known as Montauban, the name was changed to Montauban-de-Bretagne in 1995.

Population

Inhabitants of Montauban-de-Bretagne are called Montalbanais in French.

See also
Communes of the Ille-et-Vilaine department

References

External links

Official website 

Mayors of Ille-et-Vilaine Association 

Communes of Ille-et-Vilaine

Communes nouvelles of Ille-et-Vilaine